The 2004 NCAA Bowling Championship was the first annual tournament to determine the national champion of women's NCAA collegiate ten-pin bowling. The tournament was played at Emerald Bowl in Houston, Texas during April 2004. 

Nebraska defeated Central Missouri State in the championship match, 4 games to 2, to win their first national title. The Cornhuskers were coached by Bill Straub.

The awards for Most outstanding bowler and All-tournament team were not given out until 2005.

Qualification
Since there is only one national collegiate championship for women's bowling, all NCAA bowling programs (whether from Division I, Division II, or Division III) were eligible. A total of 8 teams were invited to contest the inaugural championship.

Tournament bracket 
Site: Houston, Texas

See also
 Pre–NCAA Women's Bowling Championship (United States Bowling Congress)

References

NCAA Bowling Championship
NCAA Bowling Championship
2004 in bowling
2004 in sports in Texas
April 2004 sports events in the United States